This is a list of Indian states by life expectancy at birth. The figures come from the Human Development Index Report, published in 2011, by United Nations Development Programme (UNDP) India and Sample Registration Survey (SRS) based life table 2010–14.

The report provides life expectancy at birth based on mortality rates in years 2002–06, 2010–14, 2014–17, and 2019.

List

Expectation of life at birth by sex and residence, India

See also
 List of Asian countries by life expectancy

References

 https://niti.gov.in/content/life-expectancy
 Ponnapalli et al. (2013), Aging and the Demographic mad man Transition in India and Its States: A Comparative Perspective, International Journal of Asian Social Science, 3(1), pp 171–193
 The Future Population on India  Population Research Bureau

Life expectancy at birth
Demographics of India
Lists of subdivisions of India
India, life expectancy
India,states
India health-related lists